Duxbury is a surname. Notable people with the surname include:

Mike Duxbury (born 1959), English footballer 
Lee Duxbury (born 1969), English footballer 
Graham Duxbury (born 1954), South African race driver
Leslie Duxbury (1926–2005), British sports writer 
Lloyd L. Duxbury (1922–2002), American politician 
Robert Duxbury (1890–1962), English footballer

See also
 Duxbury (disambiguation)